Antauro may refer to:
National Alliance of Workers, Farmers, University Students and Reservists, Peruvian political party
Antauro Humala, Peruvian politician and former army major